The term Christianized calendar refers to feast days which are Christianized reformulations of feasts from pre-Christian times.

Christianization of saints
Historian Peter Brown, in his The Cult of the Saints: Its Rise and Function in Latin Christianity, argued that one cannot equate the ancient cults of pagan gods with the later cults of the saints. However, Caesarius of Arles and other churchmen deplored certain customs that from time to time seem to develop around the saints, such as the prolonged drinking of toasts, ostensibly in honor of the saint.

The historicity of some Christian saints has been treated skeptically by a number of academics, either because there is a paucity of historical evidence for their origins, or due to resemblances to pre-Christian deities and festivals.  Some such local saints, especially those dating to when regions were being Christianized have been removed from the Calendar of Saints and effectively desanctified by the Catholic Church after investigations led to doubts about their historicity.  Others, such as Brigid of Kildare, have had doubts raised about their historicity, but retain their position in part due to their historical importance.

The legend of Barlaam and Josaphat was derived, via Arabic and Georgian versions, from the life story of Siddartha Gautama, known as the Buddha. The king-turned-monk Joasaphat (Arabic Yūdhasaf or Būdhasaf; Georgian Iodasaph) also gets his name from the Sanskrit Bodhisattva, the term traditionally used to refer to Gautama before his awakening.
Barlaam and Ioasaph were placed in the Orthodox calendar of saints on 26 August, and in the Roman martyrology they were canonized (as "Barlaam and Josaphat") and assigned 27 November. The story was translated into Hebrew in the Middle Ages as Ben-HaMelekh ve HaNazir ("The King's Son and the Nazirite"). Thus the Buddhist story was turned into a Christian and Jewish legend.

Theories of the Christianization of feasts

St. Valentine's Day
Saint Valentine's Day on 14 February, commemorates three separate martyrs named Valentinus. One is described as a priest at Rome, another as bishop of Interamna (modern Terni). Both apparently died sometime in the second half of the third century and were buried at different locations on the Flaminian Way. The connection of the saints' feast day with popular romantic customs arose in the Middle Ages, when it was commonly believed that half way through the second month of the year, the birds began to pair.

Alfred Kellogg and Robert Cox, have claimed that the modern customs of Saint Valentine's Day originate from the Roman Lupercalia customs. But J. Hillis Miller and others find the hypothesis unconvincing: they say there is no proof that the modern customs of Saint Valentine's Day can be traced to the Lupercalia, and the claim seems to originate from misconceptions about the festivities. Jack Oruch says there is no written record of Gelasius ever intending a replacement of Lupercalia.

Easter
Christians generally regard Easter as the most important festival of the ecclesiastical calendar. It is also the oldest feast of Christianity, and connected to the Jewish Passover. Many terms relating to Easter, such as paschal are derived from the Hebrew term for passover. In many non-English speaking countries the feast is called by some derivation of "pasch". The English term, according to the Venerable Bede, is an Anglo-Saxon form relating to Ēostre, a Teutonic goddess of the rising light of day and spring.

St. Mark's Day
According to Hippolyte Delehaye, the Greater Litanies of the Feast of St. Mark (April 25) are a continuation and adaptation of the Roman agricultural festival, Robigalia.

All Hallows
"Hallowtide", refers to the three days of Halloween, All Saints' Day, and All Souls' Day that are traditionally observed in Western Christianity from October 31 through November 2 as a commemoration of the dead.

In many early cultures, the day was considered to start at dusk. Similarly, in Celtic countries the year was considered to begin in winter at Samhain, and it was thought that the start of the year was a time when the world of the dead met that of the living; rather than a sinister event, this was considered a time when a feast should be laid on for the supposed temporary visit from the souls of the dead. The Orthodox tradition, deals rather with the zealous prayer for the dead, whom they believe are allowed to visit the living during 40 days after the moment of death, and always are greatly comforted and even saved from hell, through these prayers. In some Catholic traditions, the night is one when the graves of dead relatives are visited, with candles being lit, under a familiarly atmosphere, often including picnic; many historians argue that this is clearly derived from the pre-Christian events. The Christian festival was originally held annually on the week after Pentecost, and is still held at about this date by the Orthodox churches, but in western Europe, churches began to hold it at the same time as the pre-Christian festivals commemorating the dead, and it was eventually moved officially, by Pope Gregory III.

The process was repeated in Southern Mexico, where the Aztec feast of Mictecacihuatl in early August was syncretized into the Day of the Dead.

Christmas
Christmas on 25 December is, according to Christian tradition, a celebration of the birth of Jesus, determined around 350 A.D. by Pope Julius I. Although there have been various folk suggestions regarding the origin of Christmas, the earliest historical source stating December 25 as the date of birth of Jesus was Hippolytus of Rome (170–236), written very early in the 3rd century, based on the assumption that the conception of Jesus took place at the Spring equinox which he placed on March 25, and then added nine months. There is historical evidence that by the middle of the 4th century the Christian churches of the East celebrated the birth and Baptism of Jesus on the same day, on January 6 while those in the West celebrated a Nativity feast on December 25 (perhaps influenced by the Winter solstice); and that by the last quarter of the 4th century, the calendars of both churches included both feasts.

See also
 Allhallowtide
 Christianized sites

Notes

References
Kerenyi, Karl, Dionysus: Archetypal Image of Indestructible Life 1976.
MacMullen, Ramsay, Christianizing the Roman Empire, AD 100 – 400 Yale University Press (paperback, 1986  )
Trombley, Frank R., 1995. Hellenic Religion and Christianization c. 370-529 (in series Religions in the Graeco-Roman World) (Brill) 
Vesteinsson, Orri, 2000. The Christianization of Iceland: Priests, Power, and Social Change 1000-1300 (Oxford:Oxford University Press) 

Liturgical calendar
Saints
Ancient Christianity